Malaysia competed in the 2001 Southeast Asian Games as the host nation in Kuala Lumpur from 8 to 17 September 2001.

The host Malaysia performance was their best ever yet in Southeast Asian Games history and emerged as overall champion of the games.

Medal summary

Medals by sport

Medallists
The following Malaysian competitors won medals at the games; all dates are for September 2001.

Football

Men's tournament
Group B 

Semifinal

Gold medal match

Women's tournament
Group A

References

2001
Nations at the 2001 Southeast Asian Games